An epistolary novel tells its story through correspondence, letters, telegrams, and the like.  Here are some examples of contemporary epistolary novels:

 
Literature lists